The Amarna Royal Tombs Project (ARTP) is an archaeological expedition devoted to the Amarna Period. It was established in 1998 to ascertain on the ground and in the ancient records the fate of the missing Amarna royal dead, which were transferred to the Valley of the Kings upon the abandonment of Amarna  during the 18th Dynasty reign of the Pharaoh Tutankhamun. Nicholas Reeves serves as the project director for the Amarna Royal Tombs Project.

Valley of the Kings
Archaeological projects
Archaeological expeditions